Sol Invictus are an English neofolk band fronted by Tony Wakeford.

History 
Prior to forming Sol Invictus, Tony Wakeford had co-founded the band Death in June. In early 1984, Wakeford had been a supporter of the National Front (UK), and was fired from Death in June for "bringing his 'right-wing leanings into the group'. Subsequently, he formed Above the Ruins, a post-punk band which became controversial due to it's association with right-wing politics. In 1987, Wakeford distanced himself from these views, and formed Sol Invictus, adapting the band's name from a cult that predated Christianity. Due to Wakeford's past political associations, Sol Invictus has been accused of neo-fascism. Wakeford denied ever having been a member of the National Front or Above the Ruins, but later admitted to having been a member of both. In 1990, Wakeford formed his own record label, Tursa. With distribution by World Serpent Distribution, Tursa released numerous albums by Sol Invictus, starting with Trees in Winter. After World Serpent dissolved in the 2000s, Cold Spring began distributing the band's albums.

Style 
The band's music combines acoustic guitar playing and "neo-classical instrumentation" with elements of industrial music. According to AllMusic biographer Paul Simpson, "Sol Invictus is one of the most prolific and influential bands associated with neo-folk or apocalyptic folk". Tony Wakeford uses the phrase "folk noir" to describe his music. Sol Invictus' debut album, Against the Modern World (1988), displayed a post-punk sound which incorporated elements of what was later termed martial industrial. According to Peter Webb, the band's first four albums use a "very raw and basic" sound consisting of acoustic guitar, electric guitar, bass guitar, keyboards and drums which "evoke a premodern world that deals with a variety of subject matter from paganism, to England's quirkiness, to anti-Americanism, and looking to the traditions of Europe." The band had considerable interest in heathen and Mithraist themes, often with an explicit antipathy to Christianity, reflecting the involvement of Wakeford and other members in neopagan groups. The band's lyrics display a pessimistic, apathetic view towards modern society. Their later albums are marked by more personal lyrical themes, and expand their sound with cello, violin, orchestral drums, flute, and harp.

Discography

References

External links
Sol Invictus on Myspace

Musical groups established in 1987
English folk musical groups
Neofolk music groups
British industrial music groups
Modern pagan musical groups
Modern paganism in the United Kingdom